William Philip Price (1817 – 31 March 1891) was an English timber merchant and Liberal politician who sat in the House of Commons in two periods between 1852 and 1873.

Price was the son of William Price of Gloucester and his wife Frances George, daughter of Phillip George of Bristol. He was educated privately.  He ran a successful timber company, and was also involved in the Railway industry, being a director of the Midland Railway Company. In 1840 he became a director of the Gloucester Banking Company, and was later made the chairman in 1865. Price was a Deputy Lieutenant and J.P. for Gloucestershire and in 1849 was made High Sheriff of Gloucestershire.

In July 1852 Price was elected Member of Parliament for Gloucester. In 1857 his re-election was investigated for bribery, and it  was found that his agents had been bribing voters, although he himself was not aware of it. He was unseated in 1859.

Price was re-elected MP for Gloucester in the 1865 general election, but left parliament in May 1873 to become a railway commissioner. Price is the only Member of Parliament to be made both Steward of the Manor of Northstead and Steward of the Chiltern Hundreds.

Price married Frances Ann Chadborn, daughter of John Chadborn of Gloucester. Their son William Edwin Price was MP for Tewkesbury.

References

External links 
 

1817 births
1891 deaths
High Sheriffs of Gloucestershire
Liberal Party (UK) MPs for English constituencies
UK MPs 1852–1857
UK MPs 1857–1859
UK MPs 1865–1868
UK MPs 1868–1874
Members of Parliament for Gloucester